The College of Business and Social Studies, also known as COBASS, is a college in Biratnagar, Morang, Nepal. Academic programs include science, management and Internet studies.

Universities and colleges in Nepal
Business schools
Morang District
Educational institutions established in 1996
1996 establishments in Nepal